Tenali Ramakrishna BA. BL is a 2019 Telugu courtroom action comedy film directed by G. Nageswara Reddy. The film stars Sundeep Kishan, Hansika Motwani, and Varalaxmi Sarathkumar. This film marks the Telugu debut of Varalaxmi Sarathkumar.

Plot
Tenali Ramakrishna, a money-minded lawyer, loses or wins lawsuits depending on how he benefits from them. Things take a turn when he is tasked with a criminal case and decides to fight for justice that changes his life forever.

Cast

Sundeep Kishan as Adv. Tenali Ramakrishna BA. BL
Hansika Motwani as Rukmini
Varalaxmi Sarathkumar as Varalakshmi Devi, who has committed scam of 50 billions and Murderer of Journalist Bhupal
Raghu Babu as Durga Rao, a broker and Ramakrishna's father
Murali Sharma as Chakravarthy, a criminal lawyer and Rukmini's father, who opposes Tenali and Rukmini's relationship
Vennela Kishore as Kovelakuntla Kishore
Y. Vijaya as Varalakshmi Devi's mother
Prabhas Sreenu as Sreenu, Tenali Ramakrishna's assistant
Rajitha as Mrs. Chakravarthy, Rukmini's mother
Saptagiri as Giri
Posani Krishna Murali as a Judge
Annapoorna as Kishore's grandmother
Satya Krishnan as Fake Witness
Chammak Chandra as Varalakshmi Devi's henchman
Geetha Singh

 Ayyappa Sharma Pudipeddi as Simhadri Naidu

Soundtrack 

The music was composed by Sai Karthik.

Release
The film was dubbed and released in Tamil as Naveena Thenali.

Critical reception
Sify wrote "This time-tested theme of a comedy-looking guy turning into a righteous person of an incident still has some scope to generate laughs, engage us but the writers' team has employed old tricks to provide comedy. They have relied more on one-liners." Times of India wrote "Tenali Ramakrishna BA BL is a sloppy courtroom drama that tries too hard to be funny. A huge thumbs down!". The Hindu wrote "Barring a couple of bright moments, this is a boring courtroom drama with a middling narrative". 123Telugu wrote "On the whole, Tenali Rama Krishna is a comedy caper aimed at the target audience of single screens. The film has an impressive first half with good comedy and twists. But the second half is a let down because of jaded narration and over the top scenes".

References

External links 

2019 films
Indian comedy films
Indian courtroom films
2019 comedy films
Films directed by G. Nageswara Reddy
2010s Telugu-language films
Films scored by Sai Karthik

Films set in Kurnool
Films set in Andhra Pradesh
Films shot in Andhra Pradesh